Borgarello is a comune (municipality) in the Province of Pavia in the Italian region Lombardy, located about 25 km south of Milan and about 6 km north of Pavia. As of 31 December 2004, it had a population of 2,188 and an area of 4.8 km².

Borgarello borders the following municipalities: Certosa di Pavia, Giussago, Pavia, San Genesio ed Uniti.

Demographic evolution

References

Cities and towns in Lombardy